Hsieh Su-wei and Peng Shuai were the defending champions, but they competed with different partners.
Hsieh played with Natalie Grandin, while Peng partnered with Kimiko Date-Krumm, but they all lost in the second round (Grandin/Hsieh lost to Vera Dushevina and Arantxa Parra Santonja, Date-Krumm/Peng lost to Vania King and Yaroslava Shvedova).
In the end, it was Chuang Chia-jung and Olga Govortsova who won in the final against Gisela Dulko and Flavia Pennetta, 7–6(2), 1–6, [10–7].

Seeds
The top four seeds receive a bye into the second round.

Draw

Finals

Top half

Bottom half

External links
 Main Draw

China Open - Women's Doubles